George Robert Milne Murray  (11 November 1858 – 16 December 1911) was a Scottish naturalist, botanist, diatomist and algologist, noted for his association with T. H. Huxley and with the Discovery Expedition. He was the naturalist aboard the solar eclipse expedition to the West Indies in 1886, and was a member of several scientific voyages for the collection of marine organisms, leading valuable work on the Atlantic coast of Ireland in 1898.

Life
Murray was born in Arbroath, Angus, the son of George Murray, a tradesman, and his wife, Helen Margaret Sayles.

He was educated at Arbroath High School. In 1875, he studied cryptogamic botany at the University of Strasbourg under Anton de Bary. He became an assistant in the Department of Botany at the Natural History Museum, succeeding William Carruthers as Keeper of Botany in 1895.

The Linnean Society of London elected him a Fellow in 1878. He was elected a Fellow of the Royal Society of Edinburgh. His proposers were Sir Isaac Bayley Balfour, Frederick Orpen Bower, George Chrystal and Sir John Murray. He was elected a member of the Royal Society in 1897.

He retired in 1905 due to ill health and died in Stonehaven, Kincardineshire, on 16 December 1911.

Family

In 1884 he married Helen Welsh (d.1902).

Publications

He wrote, with A. W. Bennett, A Handbook of Cryptogamic Botany (1889) and, as sole author,  An Introduction to the Study of Seaweeds (1895), and published about forty articles on cryptogams and oceanography, mostly in the Journal of Botany.

Murray edited 'The Antarctic Manual' in 1901 and set out on Robert Falcon Scott's National Antarctic Expedition of that year although leaving the 'Discovery' at Cape Town.

Botanical Reference

References

Notes

Stearn, William T. - The Natural History Museum at South Kensington .

1858 births
1911 deaths
Scottish botanists
Employees of the Natural History Museum, London
Fellows of the Royal Society
Fellows of the Royal Society of Edinburgh
People from Arbroath
Fellows of the Linnean Society of London
Scottish marine biologists
Scottish naturalists
Scottish explorers
University of Strasbourg alumni
Scottish oceanographers
British phycologists
Academics of St George's, University of London
People associated with the Royal Veterinary College
Scottish encyclopedists
Plant collectors